Schofield is an unincorporated community in Polk County, in the U.S. state of Missouri.

History
A post office called Schofield was established in 1887, and remained in operation until 1907. The community has the name of an early settler.

References

Unincorporated communities in Polk County, Missouri
Unincorporated communities in Missouri